Townsquare Media is American media company with headquarters in Greenwich, Connecticut. Below is a list of radio stations owned by the company, alphabetized by state.

Alabama

Arizona

Arkansas

Colorado

Connecticut

Idaho

Illinois

Indiana

Iowa

Kentucky

Louisiana

Maine

Massachusetts

Michigan

Minnesota

Missouri

Montana

New Hampshire

New Jersey

New York

North Dakota

Oklahoma

South Dakota

Texas

Utah

Washington

Wyoming

References

Townsquare Media radio stations
Townsquare Media